Mecheri block is a revenue block in the Salem district of Tamil Nadu, India. It has a total of 17 panchayat villages.

See also
Bukkampatti

References 

 

Revenue blocks of Salem district